The 2022 Youth World Weightlifting Championships were a weightlifting competition held from 11 to 18 June in León, Mexico.

Medal overview

Men

Women

Medals tables 
Ranking by Big (Total result) medals
 

Ranking by all medals: Big (Total result) and Small (Snatch and Clean & Jerk)

Team ranking

Men

Women

Participating countries 

  (6)
  (1)
  (1)
  (5)
  (5)
  (2)
  (8)
  (2)
  (1)
  (2)
  (15)
  (12)
  (1)
  (1)
  (5)
  (2)
  (12)
  (1)
  (5)
  (9)
  (1)
  (20)
  (1)
  (2)
  (5)
  (1)
  (9)
  (3)
  (3)
  (1)
  (3)
  (2)
  (16)
  (7)
  (16)
  (4)
  (5)

Russia and Belarus banned from attending all international competitions due to the 2022 Russian invasion of Ukraine.

Men's results

49 kg

55 kg

61 kg

67 kg

73 kg

81 kg

89 kg

96 kg

102 kg

+102 kg

Women's results

40 kg

45 kg

49 kg

55 kg

59 kg

64 kg

71 kg

76 kg

81 kg

+81 kg

References

External links
 2022 IWF Youth World Championships: Results
 2022 IWF Youth World Championships: Results Book

IWF Youth World Weightlifting Championships
International sports competitions hosted by Mexico
Youth World
Youth World Weightlifting Championships
Weightlifting in Mexico
Weightlifting